The SEIU United Healthcare Workers West (SEIU-UHW) is a statewide local union of the Service Employees International Union in California in the United States. In 2020, it had 97,000 members, down from nearly 150,000 in 2013.

UHW is headquartered in Oakland, California and has offices statewide. UHW is an industrial union representing all classifications of health care workers in hospitals, nursing homes, clinics, home health agencies as well as homecare workers.

Ballot propositions

SEIU-UHW has filed dozens of ballot initiatives since 2012, generally proposing increased regulations on healthcare companies; few if any have passed. In the 2018, 2020, and 2022 elections, three successive propositions from SEIU-UHW related to kidney dialysis clinics appeared on the California statewide ballot. The 2020 measure would have required a physician on-site during all dialysis treatments, among other requirements; the 2022 measure loosened this and would require a physician, physician assistant, or nurse practitioner. Otherwise, they are "nearly identical". The 2018 measure would have capped profits of dialysis clinics.

There are no unionized employees of dialysis clinics in California, meaning the campaigns have not been undertaken for the benefit of the union's current members. Most commentators other than SEIU-UHW itself, including Democrats, progressive groups, hospital groups, and other labor unions, believe that these ballot propositions are a negotiation tactic in SEIU-UHW's effort to cause dialysis clinics to unionize, by leveraging the threat of continued costly ballot fights (or regulation) if they do not—rather than an earnest attempt to improve patient safety. Some have called the tactic inappropriate and an "abuse of the initiative process." SEIU has used ballot initiatives for this purpose repeatedly since 2012. The Sacramento Bee called SEIU-UHW "one of California’s fiercest political players" for its funding of the initiatives since 2018.

History

UHW was created by the merger of two SEIU local unions: Local 250 in Northern California and Local 399 in Southern California. The larger of those two locals, Local 250, began when workers at San Francisco General Hospital, who were inspired by the 1934 general strike in San Francisco, organized a union at their hospital in 1934 as the Hospital and Institutional Workers Union #19818, later affiliating with the Building Service Employees International Union, becoming BSEIU Local 250. After affiliation, they won a groundbreaking first contract with the San Francisco Hospital Conference, covering 11 hospitals. BSEIU Local 399 emerged in 1949, when several Southern California local unions consolidated under the leadership of BSEIU's Charles "Pop" Hardy who had a vision of joining small unions together to build strength. It then successfully negotiated a contract with the first Kaiser Permanente hospital, in Los Angeles, the following year.

In 1958, both BSEIU Local 250 and Local 399 joined together in leading the BSEIU effort to defeat Prop. 18, a right-to-work initiative. After BSEIU changed its name to SEIU in 1968, the two locals partnered again in 1974 to successfully lobby Congress to change federal law, allowing non-profit hospitals to organize. The two merged to form SEIU-United Healthcare Workers West (SEIU Local 2005) in 2004.

On January 27, 2009, SEIU placed UHW West under trusteeship and dismissed 70 of the local's executives, including president Sal Rosselli. Rosselli and other ousted leaders reformed under the National Union of Healthcare Workers and pushed for UHW West members at 60 facilities to vote to decertify SEIU. In the series of elections that have taken place so far to determine whether or not current SEIU-UHW members want to stay in their union or join rival NUHW, more than 73,000 have chosen to stay in the local.

On June 23, 2010 SEIU-UHW members at Kaiser Permanente ratified a contract covering 46,000 California workers guaranteeing a 3% annual wage increases. Other recent victories of the union include winning a six-week strike against Sutter Health in San Francisco; the conclusion of successful negotiations with Catholic Healthcare West; organizing victories at O'Connor Woods Retirement Community in Stockton, California (later decertified two years later which was a stunning defeat for SEIU-UHW), St. Vincent Medical Center in Los Angeles, Parkview Community Hospital in Riverside, California, and of IT workers at Kaiser; and a statewide contract victory with HCA, the nation's largest hospital company. Most of the union's current organizing work is being carried out in Southern California.

On March 26, 2020, amid concerns about a shortage of protective equipment for healthcare workers during the coronavirus pandemic, SEIU-UHW announced it had secured a stockpile of 39 million N95 masks, for purchase by various hospital systems and government agencies. (The union later clarified that it had no financial interest in arranging these transactions.) Hospitals that did not place orders became the target of SEIU petitions accusing them of "putting bottom line profits over [healthcare workers' and patients'] safety." On April 11, it was revealed that SEIU-UHW and other middlemen had been the victims of a scam and that the stockpile did not exist. The scheme was uncovered by FBI agents during attempts to seize the shipment for FEMA under the Defense Production Act.

See also
National Union of Healthcare Workers

Notes

References

External links
 
 Ballotpedia article on SEIU-UHW West
 "A Leader, His Critics, and a Union Divided", The Washington Post (May 26, 2008)
 Kris Maher, "Union Resists SEIU Effort to Centralize Control", The Wall Street Journal (January 22, 2009)

Service Employees International Union
Trade unions in California
Organizations based in Oakland, California